Carmen di Trastevere is a 1962 Italian drama film directed by Carmine Gallone and starring Giovanna Ralli.  It is a loosely based on the novella Carmen by Prosper Mérimée and on the relevant opera  by Georges Bizet.

Cast 
 Giovanna Ralli as Carmen  
 Jacques Charrier as Antonio Lizzani 
 Lino Ventura  as Vincenzo 
  Dante DiPaolo as  Tom, the American Smuggler
 Fiorenzo Fiorentini as Carmen's Guitar Player
  Luigi Giuliani as  Luca  
 Carlo Romano  as  Police Commissioner
 Enzo Liberti  as Vincenzo's Fat Accomplice
 Giuliano Persico   as Vincenzo's Tall Accomplice
 Renato Terra  as  Gerardo
 Ciccio Barbi  as Vincenzo's Accomplice in Black
 Anita Durante as Landlady of the Bording House
 Alfredo Rizzo as Doorkeeper at Villa Borghese

References

External links

1962 comedy films
1962 films
Italian comedy films
Films directed by Carmine Gallone
Films based on Carmen
Films set in Rome
Georges Bizet
Italian black-and-white films
1960s Italian films